Store Kamøya or Store Kamøy (meaning "big" Kamøya) may refer to the following places in Norway:

Store Kamøy, Gamvik, an island in Gamvik municipality, Finnmark county
Store Kamøya, Hammerfest, an island in Hammerfest municipality, Finnmark county
Storkamøya, an island in Harstad municipality, Troms county
Store Kamøya, Nordkapp, an island in Nordkapp municipality, Finnmark county

See also
Lille Kamøya (disambiguation)